Never Fade may refer to:

 "Never Fade" (Alice in Chains song), 2018
 Never Fade (EP), by Gabrielle Aplin
"Never Fade", song from the above EP
Never Fade Records, record label founded by Aplin